This is a list of all genera, species and subspecies of the subfamily Viperinae, otherwise referred to as viperines, true vipers, pitless vipers or Old World vipers. It follows the taxonomy of McDiarmid et al. (1999) and ITIS.

Atheris, Bush vipers
Atheris acuminata
Atheris anisolepis
Atheris barbouri, Uzungwe mountain bush viper
Atheris broadleyi
Atheris ceratophora, Horned bush viper
Atheris chlorechis, Western bush viper
Atheris desaixi, Mount Kenya bush viper
Atheris hetfieldi
Atheris hirsuta, Tai hairy bush viper
Atheris hispida, Bristly bush viper
Atheris katangensis, Katanga mountain bush viper
Atheris mabuensis,  Mount Mabu forest viper 
Atheris matildae,  Matilda's horned viper  
Atheris mongoensis
Atheris nitschei, Great Lakes bush viper
Atheris rungweensis, Rungwe tree viper
Atheris squamigera, Rough-scaled bush viper
Atheris subocularis
Bitis, Puff adders
Bitis albanica, Albany adder
Bitis arietans, Common puff adder
Bitis arietans arietans, Common puff adder
Bitis arietans somalica, Somali puff adder
Bitis armata, Southern adder
Bitis atropos, Mountain adder
Bitis caudalis, Horned adder
Bitis cornuta, Many-horned adder
Bitis gabonica, Gaboon viper (3003 Viper)
Bitis gabonica, East African gaboon viper
Bitis harenna
Bitis heraldica, Angolan adder
Bitis inornata, Plain mountain adder
Bitis nasicornis, Rhinoceros viper
Bitis parviocula, Ethiopian viper
Bitis peringueyi, Peringuey's desert adder
Bitis rhinoceros, West African gaboon viper
Bitis rubida, Red adder
Bitis schneideri, Namaqua dwarf adder
Bitis worthingtoni, Kenyan horned viper
Bitis xeropaga, Desert mountain adder
Causus, night adders
Causus bilineatus, lined night adder, two-striped night adder
Causus defilippii, snouted night adder
Causus lichtensteinii, forest night adder 
Causus maculatus, forest rhombic night adder, West African night adder
Causus rasmusseni
Causus resimus, green night adder
Causus rhombeatus, rhombic night adder
Cerastes, Horned vipers
Cerastes boehmeii  Tunesian horned viper 
Cerastes cerastes, Saharan horned viper
Cerastes gasperettii, Arabian horned viper
Cerastes vipera, Sahara sand viper
Daboia
Daboia mauritanica, Moorish viper
Daboia palaestinae, Palestine viper
Daboia russelii, Russell's viper
Daboia siamensis, Eastern Russell's viper
Echis, Saw-scaled vipers
Echis borkini
Echis carinatus, Saw-scaled viper
Echis carinatus astolae, Astola saw-scaled viper
Echis carinatus carinatus, South Indian saw-scaled viper
Echis carinatus multisquamatus, Central Asian saw-scaled viper
Echis carinatus sinhaleyus, Sri Lankan saw-scaled viper
Echis carinatus sochureki, Sochurek's saw-scaled viper
Echis coloratus, Painted saw-scaled viper 
Echis hughesi, Hughes' saw-scaled viper
Echis jogeri, Joger's saw-scaled viper
Echis khosatzkii
Echis leucogaster, White-bellied saw-scaled viper
Echis megalocephalus, Cherlin's saw-scaled viper
Echis ocellatus, West African saw-scaled viper
Echis omanensis, Oman saw-scaled viper
Echis pyramidum, Egyptian saw-scaled viper
Echis pyramidum aliaborri, Red carpet viper
Echis pyramidum leakeyi, Kenyan carpet viper
Echis pyramidum pyramidum, Egyptian saw-scaled viper
Echis romani
Eristicophis, McMahon's desert viper
Eristicophis macmahonii, McMahon's desert viper
Macrovipera, Large Palearctic vipers
Macrovipera lebetina, Blunt-nosed viper
Macrovipera lebetina cernovi
Macrovipera lebetina lebetina, Blunt-nosed viper
Macrovipera lebetina obtusa, West-Asian blunt-nosed viper
Macrovipera lebetina transmediterranea
Macrovipera lebetina turanica, Turan blunt-nosed viper
Macrovipera razii
Macrovipera schweizeri, Milos viper
Montatheris hindii, Montane viper
Montivipera
Montivipera albizona, Central Turkish mountain viper
Montivipera bornmuelleri, Lebanon viper (Endangered)
Montivipera bulgardaghica, Mount Bulgar viper 
Montivipera kuhrangica, Kuhrang mountain viper
Montivipera latifii, Latifi's viper
Montivipera raddei, Rock viper
Montivipera raddei albicornuta, Iranian mountain viper
Montivipera raddei kurdistanica , Kurdistan viper
Montivipera wagneri, Ocellated mountain viper
Montivipera xanthina, Rock viper
Proatheris, Lowland swamp viper
Proatheris superciliaris, Lowland swamp viper
Pseudocerastes
Pseudocerastes fieldi, Field's horned viper
Pseudocerastes persicus, Persian horned viper
Pseudocerastes urarachnoides, Iranian spider viper
Vipera, Palearctic vipers
Vipera altaica , Kazachstan viper 
Vipera ammodytes, Sand viper
Vipera ammodytes ammodytes, Western sand viper
Vipera ammodytes gregorwallneri
Vipera ammodytes meridionalis, Eastern sand viper
Vipera ammodytes montandoni, Transdanubian sand viper
Vipera anatolica , Anatolian viper (critically endangered)
Vipera aspis, Asp viper
Vipera aspis aspis, European asp
Vipera aspis atra, Black asp
Vipera aspis francisciredi, Central Italian asp
Vipera aspis hugyi, Southern Italian asp
Vipera aspis zinnikeri, Gascony asp
Vipera barani, Baran's adder
Vipera berus, common viper, adder
Vipera berus berus, Common European adder
Vipera berus bosniensis, Balkan cross adder
Vipera berus sachalinensis, Sakhalin Island adder
Vipera darevskii, Darevsky's viper
Vipera dinniki, Dinnik's viper
Vipera ebneri , Iranian Mountain steppe viper
Vipera eriwanensis, Armenian steppe viper
Vipera graeca, Greek meadow viper
Vipera kaznakovi, Caucasus viper
Vipera latastei, Lataste's viper
Vipera latastei gaditana
Vipera latastei latastei, Lataste's viper
Vipera lotievi, Caucasian meadow viper
Vipera magnifica, Magnificent viper
Vipera monticola, Atlas mountain viper
Vipera nikolskii, Nikolski's viper
Vipera olguni
Vipera orlovi, Orlov's viper (critically Endangered)
Vipera pontica, Pontic adder, Black sea viper
Vipera renardi, Steppe viper
Vipera renardi renardi
Vipera renardi parursini
Vipera renardi tienshanica, Kasackstan steppe viper
Vipera seoanei, Baskian viper
Vipera seoanei cantabrica
Vipera seoanei seoanei, Baskian viper
Vipera shemakhensis
Vipera transcaucasiana, Transcaucasian longnose viper
Vipera ursinii, Meadow vipers
Vipera ursinii macrops, Albanian meadow viper
Vipera ursinii moldavica, Romanian meadow viper 
Vipera ursinii rakosiensis, Hungarian meadow viper
Vipera ursinii wettsteini, Provence meadow viper
Vipera ursinii ursini , Italian meadow viper
Vipera walser, Piemont viper

References

 
Viperinae
Viperinae
Viperinae